Michael Spencer Waterman (born June 28, 1942) is a Professor of Biology, Mathematics and Computer Science at the University of Southern California (USC), where he holds an Endowed Associates Chair in Biological Sciences, Mathematics and Computer Science. He previously held positions at Los Alamos National Laboratory and Idaho State University.

Education and early life
Waterman grew up near Bandon, Oregon, and earned a bachelor's degree in Mathematics from Oregon State University, followed by a PhD in statistics and probability from Michigan State University in 1969.

Research and career
Waterman is one of the founders and current leaders in the area of computational biology. He focuses on applying mathematics, statistics, and computer science techniques to various problems in molecular biology. His work has contributed to some of the most widely used tools in the field. In particular, the Smith-Waterman algorithm (developed with Temple F. Smith) is the basis for many sequence alignment programs. In 1988, Waterman and Eric Lander published a landmark paper describing a mathematical model for fingerprint mapping. This work formed one of the theoretical cornerstones for many of the later DNA mapping and sequencing projects, especially the Human Genome Project. A 1995 paper by Idury and Waterman introduced Eulerian-De Bruijn sequence assembly which is widely used in next-generation sequencing projects.

With Pavel A. Pevzner (a former postdoctoral researcher in his lab), he began the international conference Research in Computational Molecular Biology (RECOMB), and he is a founding editor of the Journal of Computational Biology. Waterman also authored one of the earliest textbooks in the field: Introduction to Computational Biology.

Awards and honors
With Cyrus Chothia and David Haussler, Waterman was awarded the 2015 Dan David Prize for his contributions to the field of bioinformatics. He was awarded an Honorary Doctorate from Tel Aviv University  in 2011, and an  Honorary Doctorate from the University of Southern Denmark in 2013.

Waterman has been a member of the US American Academy of Arts and Sciences  since 1995, a member of the US National Academy of Engineering since 2012, a member of the  Chinese Academy of Sciences since 2013, and a member of the US National Academy of Sciences since 2001. He has been an academician of the  French Academy of Sciences since 2005.

Waterman was elected an ISCB Fellow in 2009 by the International Society for Computational Biology and was awarded their ISCB Senior Scientist Award in 2009.

Personal life
Waterman has written a memoir,  Getting Outside, of a childhood spent on an isolated livestock ranch on the southern coast of Oregon in the mid-twentieth century.

References

Living people
1942 births
People from Bandon, Oregon
20th-century American mathematicians
21st-century American mathematicians
American bioinformaticians
21st-century American biologists
University of Southern California faculty
Idaho State University faculty
Oregon State University alumni
Fellows of the Society for Industrial and Applied Mathematics
Fellows of the International Society for Computational Biology
Members of the United States National Academy of Engineering
Members of the United States National Academy of Sciences
Members of the French Academy of Sciences
Foreign members of the Chinese Academy of Sciences
People from Coquille, Oregon
American statisticians